Psychotic Sculpture is the second album by the American symphonic black metal band Vesperian Sorrow. After two years from their debut, the album shows a more mature Vesperian Sorrow and has received rave reviews from critics.

Track listing
 "Solitude" − 10:25
 "Psychotic Sculpture"	− 4:38
 "Spiral Symphony" − 7:19
 "Into the Realm of Dreams and Haunts" − 5:12
 "Nebula Design" − 7:26
 "The Singularity" − 1:06
 "Arena Unorthodox" − 7:29
 "Astrodramatica" − 8:40
 "Odyssium" − 5:51

References

2001 albums
Vesperian Sorrow albums